Anna Christina Nobre FBA, MAE, fNASc (known as Kia Nobre; born 1963) is a Brazilian and British cognitive neuroscientist working at the University of Oxford in England.

Nobre holds the chair in Translational Cognitive Neuroscience shared between the departments of psychiatry and of experimental psychology and linked to a professorial fellowship at St Catherine's College at the University of Oxford. She is also an adjunct professor at the Mesulam Center for Cognitive Neurology and Alzheimer's Disease at Northwestern University Feinberg School of Medicine.

Nobre's research contributions are widely recognised. She is a Fellow of the British Academy (elected 2015), a Member of the Academia Europaea (elected 2015), and an international fellow of the National Academy of Sciences (elected 2020). She received the MRC Suffrage Science Award (2016), the Broadbent Prize from the European Society of Cognitive Psychology (2019), the Lifetime Mentor Award from the Association for Psychological Science (APS), and the highly prestigious C.L. de Carvalho-Heineken Prize for Cognitive Science.  Other markers of acclaim include elected membership to the International Neuropsychological Symposium and Memory Disorders Research Society, and fellowship of the American Psychological Society.

Research
Nobre leads the Brain & Cognition Lab. Current research in the group investigates how the brain prioritises and selects information from the sensory stream and from memories at various time scales to form psychological experience and guide behaviour. In addition to revealing the basic mechanisms of these large-scale proactive and dynamic regulatory mechanisms, they examine how the mechanisms develop over the lifespan and how they are disrupted in psychiatric and neurodegenerative disorders. The research combines various behavioural methods (psychophysics, eye tracking, virtual reality) with innovative and complementary non-invasive techniques to image and stimulate the human brain (magneto- and electroencephalography, functional magnetic resonance imaging, and brain stimulation).

Research milestones by Nobre and her group include: discovering brain areas specialised for word recognition (1994) and face processing (1994) in the human brain using intracranial recordings; describing the functional neuroanatomy of the network for controlling spatial attention in the human brain and noting its relation to oculomotor control (1997); pioneering the neuroscientific study of temporal expectations (temporal orienting) (1998), demonstrating the ability to orient selective attention within working memory (2003), developing new experimental approaches to investigate how long-term memories guide selective attention (2006), and introducing new somatic markers of attention in memory (2019).

Leadership and service 
Nobre has held many leadership positions at Oxford.  She serves in the University Council, University committees overseeing research and innovation and nominations, and the Museum of Natural History's Board of Visitors.  She previously acted as head of the Department of Psychology, chair of the Oxford Neuroscience committee, and as a delegate of Oxford University Press (2005-2015). Nobre is the scientific director of the Oxford Centre for Human Brain Activity (OHBA), a state-of-the-art facility for fundamental and translational human neurophysiology and neuroimaging research and part of the Oxford Wellcome Centre for Integrative Neuroimaging (WIN) and the NIHR Oxford Health Biomedical Research Centre (OH-BRC). To bring OHBA the best human neuroscience to the benefit of patients OHBA has launched the Brain Health Centre – an integrated research and clinical environment providing high-quality assessment for patients' clinical care.

Worldwide, Nobre contributes to various advisory bodies to scientific institutions and holds roles on multiple editorial, funding, conference-programme and prize-awarding boards.

Life and work
Nobre grew up in Rio de Janeiro, Brazil, and was educated at the Escola Americana do Rio de Janeiro (EARJ). As a young child, she spent two years in New York City, while her father completed a postgraduate degree at NYU (1967–68). She moved to the United States to complete her higher education. She obtained her BA from Williams College in 1985, with a Contract Major in Neuroscience; and obtained her PhD (1993) from Yale University for research on intracranial and non-invasive electrophysiological studies of language and attention in the human brain, supervised by Gregory McCarthy. During her doctoral and then postdoctoral period at Yale, she was part of the first studies to use non-invasive fMRI to investigate cognitive functions in the human brain. In 1993, she joined Marsel Mesulam's group at the Behavioural Neurology Unit at Beth Israel Hospital, Harvard Medical School as Instructor.

She moved to Oxford in 1994 to take up a McDonnell Pew Lecturership in Cognitive Neuroscience and the combined Astor and Todd-Bird Junior Research Fellowship at New College (1994-1996). This was the first JRF in the discipline of psychology at Oxford. Before her current Chair (2014), she was a titular Professor at the Department of Experimental Psychology (Lecturer 1996–2002, Reader 2002–2006) and a Tutorial Fellow at New College, Oxford (1996–2014). At New College, she was the first female Tutorial Fellow in a science discipline. In recognition of her contributions and standing, she was made an Honorary Fellow of New College (2016).

References

External links
 The Oxford Centre for Human Brain Activity (OHBA)
NIHR Oxford Health Biomedical Research Centre (OH-BRC)

1963 births
Living people
Yale University alumni
Harvard University alumni
Neuroscientists
Experimental psychology
Fellows of New College, Oxford
Oxford University Press Delegate
Williams College alumni
Brazilian women neuroscientists
Fellows of the British Academy
Brazilian expatriate academics
Foreign associates of the National Academy of Sciences